is a former Japanese football player.

Playing career
Tsunematsu was born in Kagoshima Prefecture on July 16, 1976. After graduating from Fukuoka University, he joined newly was promoted to J2 League club, Albirex Niigata in 1999. On May 5, he debuted as substitute goalkeeper from the 89th minute against Montedio Yamagata because regular goalkeeper Shinya Yoshihara received a red card. Next match on May 9, he played full time against FC Tokyo instead Yoshihara was suspended. However he could only play these match and retired end of 1999 season.

Club statistics

References

External links

1976 births
Living people
Association football people from Kagoshima Prefecture
Japanese footballers
J2 League players
Albirex Niigata players
Association football goalkeepers